The 1985 US Open was a tennis tournament played on outdoor hard courts at the USTA National Tennis Center in New York City in New York in the United States. It was the 105th edition of the US Open and was held from August 27 to September 8, 1985.

Seniors

Men's singles

 Ivan Lendl defeated  John McEnroe 7–6(7–1), 6–3, 6–4
 It was Lendl's 2nd career Grand Slam title and his 1st US Open title.

Women's singles

 Hana Mandlíková defeated  Martina Navratilova 7–6(7–3), 1–6, 7–6(7–2)
 It was Mandlíková's 3rd career Grand Slam title and her 1st US Open title.

Men's doubles

 Ken Flach /  Robert Seguso defeated  Henri Leconte /  Yannick Noah 6–7(5–7), 7–6(7–1), 7–6(8–6), 6–0
 It was Flach's 1st career Grand Slam title and his 1st US Open title. It was Seguso's 1st career Grand Slam title and his only US Open title.

Women's doubles

 Claudia Kohde-Kilsch /  Helena Suková defeated  Martina Navratilova /  Pam Shriver 6–7(5–7), 6–2, 6–3
 It was Kohde-Kilsch's 1st career Grand Slam title and her only US Open title. It was Suková's 1st career Grand Slam title and her 1st US Open title.

Mixed doubles

 Martina Navratilova /  Heinz Günthardt defeated  Elizabeth Smylie /  John Fitzgerald 6–3, 6–4
 It was Navratilova's 35th career Grand Slam title and her 8th US Open title. It was Günthardt's 4th and last career Grand Slam title and his only US Open title.

Juniors

Boys' singles

 Tim Trigueiro defeated  Joey Blake 6–2, 6–3

Girls' singles

 Laura Garrone defeated  Andrea Holíková 6–2, 7–6

Boys' doubles

 Joey Blake /  Darren Yates defeated  Patrick Flynn /  David Macpherson 3–6, 6–3, 6–4

Girls' doubles

 Andrea Holíková /  Radka Zrubáková defeated  Mariana Perez-Roldan /  Patricia Tarabini 6–4, 2–6, 7–5

External links
 Official US Open website

 
 

 
US Open
US Open (tennis) by year
US Open
US Open
US Open
US Open